The University of Calicut, also known as Calicut University, is a state-run public university headquartered at Tenhipalam in Malappuram district of the state of Kerala, India. Established in 1968, it is the first university to be set up in northern Kerala. The university is coordinated by the University Grants Commission (re-accredited by NAAC with 'A+' grade).

Calicut University, created by bifurcating Kerala University, is the second university to be set up in Kerala. M. M. Gani, 1969–75, was the first vice-chancellor of the university. Its primary catchment area is the northern districts of Kerala. Calicut University has nine schools and 34 departments. As of 2018-19 Calicut University had 301 undergraduate students and 1799 post-graduate students. The number of full-time doctoral students was 581. The university was ranked 54th among Indian universities by the National Institutional Ranking Framework (NIRF) in 2020 and 76th overall.

Calicut University manages around 400 independent affiliated colleges spread across northern Kerala. It also conducts examinations for the students of the affiliated colleges. It is also the largest 'affiliating' university in Kerala.

History 

The university was established through a Kerala government plan bifurcating the Kerala University. As per the plan, the four post-graduate departments of the Kerala University operating in Calicut were annexed to the new university.

Campus
Most of the teaching and research departments, the Office of the Vice-Chancellor, and the Administration Block are situated on the main campus. The university also has two off-campus centres, one at Thrissur and the other, specially meant for tribal empowerment, located in the Western Ghat area of the state, Wayanad. Besides these, there are self-financing centres located in different parts of the area of jurisdiction.

Central facilities 

The following are the central facilities in the University of Calicut.

 Pareeksha Bhavan
 Calicut University Computer Center
 CHMK Library
 Botanical Garden
 Thaliyola
 Madhava Obeservatory
 Central Sophisticated Instrumentation Facility
 University Museum
 University Park
 University Science Instrumentation Center

CHMK Library 

 Calicut University Library was established in 1971.
 The library was renamed after C.H. Mohammed Koya (former chief Minister, Government of Kerala).
 It has a collection of about 95,000 books and subscribes to 218 journals and 10 newspapers.
 The library follows the Anglo American Cataloguing Rules II (with slight modifications) for cataloguing and the Dewey Decimal Scheme of Classification for the classification of books.

Organisation and administration

Governance 
A Vice-chancellor is the head of the university. M. K. Jayaraj is the current Vice-Chancellor of the University of Calicut.

 The Senate - consists of 16 members including the Chancellor (Governor of Kerala), the Pro-Chancellor (Kerala Minister of Education), the Vice-Chancellor and Pro Vice-Chancellor. 
 The Syndicate - consists of 6 members including the Vice-Chancellor, Pro Vice-Chancellor, Higher Education Secretary, Director of Public Instruction and Director of Collegiate Education.
 The Academic Council -  the supreme academic body of the university.
 The Faculties
 The Boards of Studies Boards of Studies -  the basic design of the curricula is done by the Boards of Studies. 
 The  Students' Council -  consists of 22 elected members from various independent affiliated colleges and university departments and six members including the Vice-Chancellor.
 The Finance committee - consists of the Vice-Chancellor, Pro Vice-Chancellor, representatives of the Senate, the Syndicate and the Academic Council, the Finance Secretary to Government or an Officer not below the rank of a Joint Secretary nominated by him and the Higher Education Secretary to Government.

Endowment 
From the 2019 Annual Report

 Kerala State Non-Plan Grant (for 2018/19) - Rs. 20,814.88 lakhs
Income from internal sources - Rs. 12,875.13 lakhs
 Kerala State Plan Grant (for 2018/19) - Rs. 2,500.00 lakhs
 Grant from UGC under XIIth Plan - Rs. 436.40 lakhs

Salaries and pension alone contribute to 63.03% of the total expenditure.

 Salary - Rs. 14,541.12 lakhs 
 Pension & DCRG - Rs. 8,151.50 lakhs 
 Development & Modernisation - Rs. 3,146.32 lakhs 
 Conduct of Exam -  Rs. 2,105.00 lakhs 
 Scholarships/Research Projects - Rs. 761.81 lakhs

Departments 

Each school in Calicut University comprises a group of related departments, headed by director. Each department in the school has separate head of the department.

There are nine schools, 34 departments with three centres and 11 chairs. The university has two off campus centres, one at Thrissur and the other in Wayanad.

Off campus campus centres I 

 Lakshadweep
 Dr. John Matthai Centre, Thrissur
 Centre for Folklore Studies

Off campus campus centres II 

 School of Drama and Fine Arts: Located in Aranattukara, a suburb of Thrissur city this department of the university provides formal education and training in drama and theatre. The school is affiliated with National School of Drama. The school was established in 1977 as a centre for drama artists in Kerala. In 2000, the institute started the music department offering Post Graduate and PhD courses.
 Institute of Tribal Studies and Research: Institute of Tribal Studies & Research is located at Chethalayam in Wayanad district is established for empowering tribal students for higher education. The centre is also devoted to carry out research on tribal communities.

Affiliated colleges

From the 2019 Annual Report

Its current jurisdiction extends to five central and northern districts of the state. The university currently has about 391 'affiliated colleges'. These colleges are spread over Malappuram district (122), Kozhikode district (105 colleges), Thrissur district (74), Palakkad district (73) and Wayanad district (17). It also conducts examinations for the students of the affiliated colleges.

A total annual intake of students in the affiliated colleges is nearly 100,000. Most of the colleges are Self Financing Colleges and the rest are Government or Aided Colleges. Most of the colleges offer only under-graduate degrees, while around 100 colleges also offer post-graduate degrees.

Classification based on funding 
 Government Colleges (41)
 Aided Colleges (60)
 Self Financing Colleges  (290)
Subject-wise they comprise 254 Arts & Science Colleges, 63 Training Colleges, 40 Engineering/Technical Colleges, 10 Law Colleges, 33 Arabic/Oriental Title Colleges, 11 I. H. R. D. Centres, eight Management Studies Colleges, one Music College, one Fine Arts college, two Colleges of Physical Education, two colleges for Hotel Management.

The university publishes a list of affiliated colleges and courses.

Types of affiliated colleges 

 Architecture-Engineering
Training
 Management
Law
 Arts & Science-Arabic/Oriental Title
 Physical Education

Academics

Rankings
University of Calicut ranked 69 among Indian Universities in NIRF ranking 2022.

Demographics

Student life

Cultural festival 
The annual 'Interzonal' cultural festival, 'kalolsavam', is held during the months of January - April or in between. The Interzones are conducted among students from the independent 'affiliated colleges' spread across five northern Kerala Districts. The various Kerala Districts conducts different zonal competitions and the winners gain entry to the 'interzonal' event.

The festivals goes on for a week at the most (offstage and onstage).

Sports competitions 
The annual sports competitions also takes place between the inter colleges among the zones as well as among the zonal colleges. The sports event follow the cultural event and go on for a week.

Notable alumni

Politician
 R. Bindu, Minister of Higher Education Kerala
 K. T. Jaleel, former Minister of Higher Education Kerala
 P. Sreeramakrishnan, Former speaker of Kerala Legislative Assembly
 M. B. Rajesh, Current Minister of Local Self-Governments and Excise Kerala
 N. Samsudheen MLA
 V. T. Balram, Ex. MLA
 Surendran Pattel, Judge for 240th Texas District Court

Academist
 Abraham V. M, vice-chancellor of Christ University, Bangalore
 Ayyappanpillai Ajayaghosh, organic chemist, Shanti Swarup Bhatnagar laureate

sportsperson
 Anju Bobby George, Indian athlete
 Jimmy George, volleyball player
 V. P. Suhair, Indian professional footballer
 V. Diju, Indian Badminton player. Olympian, Arjuna Awardee

Arts
 Jenith Kachappilly, Indian film director
 Girish Puthenchery, Indian lyricist, poet, scriptwriter and screenwriter

 K. K. N. Kurup, historian and former Vice-Chancellor of the University of Calicut
 M. N. Karassery, Malayalam author
 Mohammed Faizal P. P, Member of Lok Sabha
 Rajesh Touchriver, Indian film writer, director
 Ranjith, Indian film director
 Ranjith Padinhateeri, biological physicist, N-Bios laureate
 Richard Hay, politician
 Shyamaprasad, Indian film director
 Sithara, playback singer
 Thalappil Pradeep, Padma Shri 2020
 C. R. Rajagopalan, folklore researcher and writer.

See also 
Madhava Observatory

References

External links 

 

 
Educational institutions established in 1968
1968 establishments in Kerala
Universities in Kerala
Universities and colleges in Malappuram district